The Canadian Folk Music Awards are an annual music awards ceremony presenting awards in a variety of categories for achievements in both traditional and contemporary folk music, and other roots music genres, by Canadian musicians. The awards program was created in 2005 by a group of independent label representatives, folk music presenters, artists, and enthusiasts to celebrate and promote Canadian folk music.

Awards ceremonies
The following is a listing of all Canadian Folk Music Awards ceremonies.

Categories

Classic Canadian Album
In addition to the main categories listed above, one additional category has been presented only once.

References

External links